Woodstock Roller Derby (WRD) is a women's flat-track roller derby league located in Woodstock, Ontario. WRD was started in 2011 and currently has one team called the Woodstock Warriors. The league's first public event was held in September 2012, against the Rollergettes from Toronto.

References

External links
 Woodstock Roller Derby (copy archived June 2015)

Roller derby leagues in Canada
Roller derby leagues established in 2011
Sport in Woodstock, Ontario
2011 establishments in Ontario